Sophie Tapie, (born 20 February 1988 in the 12th arrondissement of Paris) is a French singer and comedian.

Biography 
Sophie Tapie is the daughter of Bernard Tapie. Her first acting role was on television in the series Commissaire Valence (2004), in which her father plated the lead role. In 2004, she joined the Cours Eva Saint-Paul theatre school in Paris.

In 2008, after returning to France, she performed in the comic play Oscar at the Théâtre du Gymnase, alongside Bernard Farcy and Chantal Ladesou, only to find her father on stage at her side a few years later. Later, she became a host on the TV channel 13ème Rue.

In 2012 she was a contestant on season 2 of The Voice on TF1.

IN 2014, she appeared in Alexandre Arcady's film 24 Days, about the murder of Ilan Halimi, playing the role of lieutenant Vogel.

In 2015, she released her first country music album Sauvage.

She enjoys horse riding, and notably participated in the Chantilly Jumping at the Chantilly Racecourse.

She sang the French national anthem at the opening of the 2022 French Grand Prix.

Filmography

Television 
 2004: Commissaire Valence
 2012: Le Jour où tout a basculé (episode 167 season 2): Audrey

Cinema 
 2014: 24 jours d'Alexandre Arcady: Lieutenant Vogel

Theatre 
 2008: Oscar by Claude Magnier, directed by Philippe Hersen at the Théâtre du Gymnase: Julie Barnier

Discography

Studio albums 
 2015: Sauvage
 2021: 1988
 2022: 1988 renaît de ses cendres

Singles 
 2015: Noël Lachance (tel est mon destin)
 2015: Des milliards de petits corps
 2015: J’envoie en l’air
 2018: We Love
 2020: Malaisant
 2021: L’amour en solde (with Jok’Air)
 2022: Pas vu pas pris

References 

Living people
1988 births
Singers from Paris
21st-century French women singers
21st-century French comedians
French women comedians
French female equestrians